Azuragrion is a genus of damselfly in family Coenagrionidae. 
The genus contains the following species:
Azuragrion buchholzi 
Azuragrion granti  - Socotra Bluet
Azuragrion kauderni 
Azuragrion nigridorsum  - Black-tailed Bluet, Sailing Bluet
Azuragrion somalicum 
Azuragrion vansomereni  - Tiny Bluet

References

Coenagrionidae
Taxonomy articles created by Polbot